The 39th District of the Iowa House of Representatives in the state of Iowa.

Current elected officials
Eddie Andrews is the representative currently representing the district.

Past representatives
The district has previously been represented by:
 Vernon A. Ewell, 1971–1973
 Glenn F. Brockett, 1973–1979
 Michael R. Lura, 1979–1981
 Thomas E. Swartz, 1981–1983
 Hugo A. Schnekloth, 1983–1991
 Robert L. Rafferty, 1991–1993
 Dan J. Boddicker, 1993–2003
 Dell Hanson, 2003–2005
 Dawn Pettengill, 2005–2013
 Jake Highfill, 2013–2019
 Karin Derry, 2019–2021
 Eddie Andrews, 2021–present

References

039